is a former world Junior Lightweight boxing champion.

Numata turned professional in 1962 and won the Lineal, WBC and WBA super featherweight world titles by defeating Flash Elorde by decision in 1967, although Numata was knocked down in the 3rd round. He lost the title in his first defense to Hiroshi Kobayashi by KO in the 12th. Numata was down once in the 6th and three times in the 12th round.

In 1970 Numata captured the WBC super featherweight title with a decision over Rene Barrientos.  He defended the title three times before losing the belt to Ricardo Arredondo in 1971. Numata retired a year later.

See also 
 List of super-featherweight boxing champions
 List of WBA world champions
 List of WBC world champions
 List of The Ring world champions
 List of undisputed boxing champions
 List of Japanese boxing world champions
 Boxing in Japan

References

External links 
 
 Yoshiaki Numata - CBZ Profile

1945 births
Living people
World Boxing Association champions
World Boxing Council champions
The Ring (magazine) champions
World super-featherweight boxing champions
World boxing champions
Sportspeople from Hokkaido
Japanese male boxers